is a Japanese former swimmer. She competed in the women's 100 metre butterfly at the 1964 Summer Olympics.

References

External links
 

1946 births
Living people
Olympic swimmers of Japan
Swimmers at the 1964 Summer Olympics
Place of birth missing (living people)
Japanese female butterfly swimmers